Sanduru (often written Sandur) is a town in Bellary District in the Indian state of Karnataka.  It is the administrative seat of Sanduru taluka.
Sandur was ruled by the Ghorpade royal family of the Marathas.The present scion of Sandur is Ajai Ghorpade.

Geography 

It has an average elevation of 565 metres (1853 feet).

Sandur, like the surrounding villages of Dowlthpur, Ramgad, Swamihalli, Donimalai, is set among green mountains, valleys, and deep gorges.

Climate 
Sandur has a tropical savannah climate which lies on the border of semi-arid type of bellary and hospet, the climate in sandur is cooler than surroundings due to its elevation and has recorded a maximum temperature of 42 degrees and a minimum of 6 degrees.
Sandur receives 750mm of precipitation but has seen more than 1000mm of rainfall.

Demographics 
 India census, Sanduru had a population of 27,601. Males constitute 52s 62%, and female literacy is 62%.  13% of the population is under 6 years of age.

See also 
 Sandur

References

External links 

 Genealogy of the Ghorpade dynasty of Sandur
Sandur - Unexplored Wonder!

Cities and towns in Bellary district